Badanahatti  is a village in the southern state of Karnataka, India. It is located in the Kurugodu taluk of Ballari district in Karnataka.

Demographics
 India census, Badanahatti had a population of 6977 with 3583 males and 3394 females.

See also
 Ballari
 Districts of Karnataka

References

External links
 http://Bellary.nic.in/

Villages in Bellary district